The 1966 Western Michigan Broncos football team represented Western Michigan University in the Mid-American Conference (MAC) during the 1966 NCAA University Division football season.  In their third season under head coach Bill Doolittle, the Broncos compiled a 7–3 record (5–1 against MAC opponents), finished in a tie for first place in the MAC, and were outscored by their opponents, 194 to 175.  The team played its home games at Waldo Stadium in Kalamazoo, Michigan.

The team's statistical leaders included Jim Boreland with 756 passing yards, Tim Majerle with 731 rushing yards, and Gary Crain with 450 receiving yards. Defensive tackle Bob Rowe and halfback Gary Crain were the team captains. For the second consecutive year, Bob Rowe received the team's most outstanding player award. Bill Doolittle was named the MAC coach of the year.

Schedule

References

Western Michigan
Western Michigan Broncos football seasons
Mid-American Conference football champion seasons
Western Michigan Broncos football